Bernward Joerges (born 1 September 1937 in Stuttgart) is a professor of sociology (emeritus) at Technical University of Berlin and director of the Metropolitan Research Group at Wissenschaftszentrum Berlin. He holds a degree in Psychology (Dipl. Psych.), Dr. phil. and Dr. phil. habil. in Sociology.  After early studies of development, environment, consumption and everyday life technology, his major areas of interest are social studies of science and technology, and urban and architectural studies. 

He coined the concept of "Konsumarbeit". 

He countered an argumentation by Langdon Winner concerning the politics of artifacts illustrated by Robert Moses' bridges of Long Island Parkway.

He was a member of the editorial board of the  Sociology of the Sciences Yearbook (since 1989). He is a member of the editorial board of the Jahrbuch für Technikphilosophie. He is a member of the Wissenschsftlicher Beirat of the journal Dialektik, Zeitschrift fUr Kulturphilosophie.

Books
 Joerges, Bernward (2020) Robotization of Work? Answers from popular culture, media and social sciences (with Barbara  Czarniawska). Cheltenham: Edward Elgar. .

 
 Bernward Joerges (1997). LogIcons - Bilder zwischen Theorie und Anschauung (mit Ute Hoffmann und Ingrid Severin). Berlin: edition sigma. .
 Joerges, Bernward (1996). Technik - Körper der Gesellschaft: Arbeiten zur Techniksoziologie. Frankfurt: Suhrkamp. .
 Bernward Joerges (1996). Körper-Technik : Aufsätze zur Organtransplantation. Berlin: edition sigma. .
 Bernward Joerges (1994). Technik ohne Grenzen (mit Ingo Braun, eds.). Frankfurt: Suhrkamp. .
 Bernward Joerges (1992). Sociologie des techniques de la vie quotidienne (ed. avec Alain Gras, Victor Scardigli). Paris: Editions L'Harmattan. .
 Bernward Joerges (1988). Technik im Alltag (ed.). Frankfurt: Suhrkamp. .
 Bernward Joerges (1987). Public Policies and Private Actions (ed. with Georges Gaskell). London: Gower Publishing. .
 Bernward Joerges (1986). Consumer Behavior and Energy Policy: An International Perspective (ed. with Eric Monnier et al.). London: Praeger. .
 Bernward Joerges (1977). Gebaute Umwelt und Verhalten: Über das Verhältnis von Technikwissenschaften und Sozialwissenschaften am Beispiel der Architektur und der Verhaltenstheorie. Baden Baden: Nomos. .
 Bernward Joerges (1969). Community Development in Entwicklungsländern (mit Sung-Jo Park). Stuttgart: Klett. ASIN: B0000BRSWJ.

References

German sociologists
1937 births
Living people
Place of birth missing (living people)
Academic staff of the Technical University of Berlin
German male writers
Philosophers of technology